Rozhanovce is a village in Košice-okolie District of eastern Slovakia. It is situated about  far from the city of Košice.

Names
1773 Rozgony, Roscho[no]wetz, Rozhonow, 1786 Rozgony, Roszonowecz, 1808 Rozgony, Rozgoňowce, Rozhanowce, 1863–1913 Rozgony, 1920– Rozhanovce.

A smaller part of Rozhanovce is located on flat land and a larger part in a hilly area rising from the west to the east. The best view of this village is from the west.

In historical records, the village was first mentioned in 1270. Rozhanovce is best known for the Battle of Rozgony (June 15, 1312), in which King Charles I of Hungary decisively defeated the Amadé Aba family, who were supported by the troops of Matthew III Csák. Both Aba and Csák were de facto rulers in Upper Hungary (today parts of Hungary, Slovakia and Ukraine).

In 2004, Rozhanovce had a population of about 2,160 people. 96.9% of them were Slovaks, 1.6% Romani. 79.4% of inhabitants were Roman Catholics, 7.7% Greek Catholics, and 3.9% atheists.

The festival called "Abov celebrations" takes place every year in Rozhanovce.

References

External links

Official website of Rozhanovce 

Villages and municipalities in Košice-okolie District